Zacorisca electrina is a species of moth of the family Tortricidae. It is found on Mindanao in the Philippines.

References

	

Moths described in 1912
Zacorisca